Apamea robertsoni is a moth of the family Noctuidae. It was described from Southern California in 2006.

References

Apamea (moth)
Moths of North America
Moths described in 2006